"I Love You This Big" is the debut song by American country music artist and American Idol season 10 winner, Scotty McCreery.  It was written  by Brett James, Ester Dean, Jay "Saint" Smith and Lil' Ronnie Jackson, and was released in May 2011 as the first single from the album Clear as Day.  The song was first performed on the American Idol season 10 finale on May 24, 2011. The single was released to digital retailers after the final result show held on May 25, 2011. This song features backing vocals from Destinee & Paris.

Music video
A video for the song has been released. McCreery explained the video as "This is going to be kind of a nice little chill, summertime barbecue, kind of like a community thing on the Fourth of July." The music video was released on August 9, 2011. The video starts with McCreery and his band getting set up in daylight for a Fourth of July party to take place that night. Later, people begin showing up in groups to the party and setting up to watch the concert. That night McCreery is singing with his band for the concert. Meanwhile, the focus goes to four couples, a blonde, curly-haired girl looking for a guy and then finding him and hug, a blonde girl and a guy holding hands, talking and kissing, a black haired girl running into her guy friend and hugging and a blonde girl and a guy getting food, holding hands and talking. Fireworks go off in the air as McCreery goes into the key change, and the couples switch to watching the fireworks and the concert. McCreery's mother is featured in the video. It was filmed in Los Angeles at Andrews Point.

Composition
The song begins in the key of D major with the final chorus in E major. The video was directed by Shane Drake.

Commercial performance
"I Love You This Big" debuted at number 32 on the US Billboard Hot Country Songs chart, following his win on American Idol. This is the highest debut of any new Country artist since Neilsen’s inception on January 20, 1990. The song sold 171,404 units in its first week. On the Billboard Hot 100, the song debuted and peaked at number 11. It is a top 15 radio hit.

The song was certified Platinum by the Recording Industry Association of America on November 11, 2014.  As of February, 2014, the song has sold 915,000 copies.

Charts and certifications

Weekly charts

Year-end charts

Certifications

Release history

References

2011 debut singles
2011 songs
Scotty McCreery songs
Songs written by Ester Dean
Songs written by Brett James
Country ballads
Song recordings produced by Mark Bright (record producer)
Music videos directed by Shane Drake
Mercury Nashville singles